{{DISPLAYTITLE:C19H18ClN3O}}
The molecular formula C19H18ClN3O (molar mass: 339.82 g/mol, exact mass: 339.1138 u) may refer to:

 Cresyl violet
 Cyprazepam